Martin Bell (born 1938) is a British former broadcast war reporter and former independent politician.

Martin Bell may also refer to:
 Martin Bell (director) (born 1943), American filmmaker
 Martin Bell (poet) (1918–1978), British poet
 Martin Bell (racewalker), British athlete at the 1998 European Race Walking Cup
 Martin Bell (skier) (born 1964), Scottish skier
 Martin Bell (archaeologist), professor at the University of Reading, England
 Martin–Bell syndrome, or Fragile X syndrome, a genetic syndrome
 Martin Bell, member of British comedy music duo Bell & Spurling

See also
 Martyn Bell (born 1964), British racing driver

Bell, Martin